Castle Douglas Hospital is a health facility in Academy Street, Castle Douglas, Dumfries and Galloway, Scotland. It is managed by NHS Dumfries and Galloway.

History 
The facility, which was commissioned to commemorate Queen Victoria's Diamond Jubilee, was designed by Richard Park (1842-1906) and opened in October 1899. Additions included a nurses' home in 1934 and an out-patients' department in 1935. It joined the National Health Service in 1948.

References 

Hospitals in Dumfries and Galloway
NHS Scotland hospitals
1899 establishments in Scotland
Hospitals established in 1899
Hospital buildings completed in 1899
Castle Douglas